Ambagamuwa may refer to:

 Ambagamuwa (7°1'N 80°28'E), a village in Sri Lanka
 Ambagamuwa (7°18'N 80°33'E), a village in Sri Lanka
 Ambagamuwa Divisional Secretariat, Sri Lanka